The James Sewell Ballet is a Minneapolis, Minnesota-based ballet company of eight dancers founded in 1990 by James Sewell and Sally Rousse.

History
James Sewell Ballet (JSB) was founded in 1990 by James Sewell and Sally Rousse in New York City. In 1992, Sewell and Rousse moved the company to Minneapolis, Minnesota, Sewell's hometown, where it has resided for nearly two decades.

Notes

External links
 

Ballet companies in the United States
Arts organizations based in Minneapolis
Dance in Minnesota
Non-profit organizations based in Minnesota
Arts organizations established in 1990
Performing groups established in 1990
1990 establishments in New York City